Eden Valley 216 is an Indian reserve of the Stoney Nakoda First Nation, comprising Bearspaw, Chiniki, and Wesley First Nations, located near Longview, Alberta.

References 

Indian reserves in Alberta
Nakoda (Stoney)